Canada took part at the 1958 British Empire and Commonwealth Games Cardiff, (Wales, United Kingdom). With a total of 27 medals, Canada ranked tenth on the medal tally.

Medals

Individual medals

Gold 

Rowing:
 Men's Eight team

Silver 
Athletics:
 Robert Reid, Men's Pole vault
 Jack Smyth, Men's Triple Jump

Fencing:
 Men's Épée team

Rowing:
 Men's Coxless Fours team
 Men's Coxed Fours team

Swimming:
 Men's 4×110 yd medley relay team
 Women's 4×110 yd freestyle relay team

Diving:
 Bill Patrick, Men's 3 Metres Springboard
 Irene MacDonald, Women's 3 Metres Springboard

Weightlifting:
 Dave Baillie, Men's Heavyweight - Overall

Bronze 

Athletics:
 Mike Agostini, Men's 100 yards
 Terry Tobacco, Men's 440 yards
 Hans Moks, Men's Javelin throw
 Jackie Gelling, Women's Shot Put
 Women's 4 x 110 yards relay team

 Boxing:
 Raymond Galante, Men's Light Welterweight
 James Arthur Walters, Men's Light Middleweight
 Robert Piau, Men's Middleweight

Swimming:
 Robert Wheaton, Men's  110 yards backstroke
 Men's 4 x 220  yards freestyle relay team
 Margaret Iwasaki, Women's 110 yards butterfly
 Women's 4 x 110 yards medley relay team

Weightlifting:
 Marcel Gosselin, Men's Bantamweight - Overall
 Adrian Gilbert, Men's Middleweight - Overall

Wrestling:
 Fred Flannery, Men's Flyweight
 Bob  Steckle, Men's Light Heavyweight

External links 
 Commonwealth Games Canada

1958
Nations at the 1958 British Empire and Commonwealth Games
Commonwealth Games